Jamie Hampton and Anna Tatishvili were the defending champions, both decided to participate, but with different partners.

Hampton paired up with Melanie Oudin, whilst Tatishvili played with Alexa Glatch, and both faced each other in the quarterfinals, Hampton and Oudin were the winners but then ended up losing to Andrea Hlaváčková and Lucie Hradecká in the semifinals.

Hlaváčková and Hradecká went on to win the title, defeating Vesna Dolonts and Stéphanie Foretz Gacon in the final, 7–6(7–4), 6–2.

Seeds

Draw

External Links
 Draw

Dow Corning Tennis Classic - Doubles
Dow Corning Tennis Classic